Swanson Health Products (SHP) is a natural health catalog and Internet marketing company headquartered in Fargo, North Dakota. The company sells natural health and wellness products, including health foods, dietary supplements such as vitamins, minerals, herbs, as well as natural personal care products direct to consumers through mail-order catalogs and an e-commerce website.

History 
Swanson Health Products was started in 1969 in Fargo by Leland Swanson Sr. A self-taught natural health enthusiast, Swanson was heavily influenced by Linus Pauling, Irwin Stone, Roger J. Williams, Paul Bragg, and Adelle Davis.

Swanson's personal supplementation regimen began with vitamin E, which he ordered from one of the first health supplement outlets in the country, Sturdee Health Products, the nation's oldest mail order vitamin supplier at the time. By 1968, he was a regular user of several vitamins and supplements and began ordering them in bulk to maintain his own supply. Not long after he decided to test the market himself and ordered 5,000 vitamin E capsules from a manufacturer in Ohio, purchased an advertisement in Capper's Weekly Magazine and began selling supplements through the mail. Shortly thereafter, he was putting together small catalogs of his own to mail out to potential customers.

By 1980, SHP was operating with about 10 employees out of a storefront in downtown. In 1982 the company moved its mail order manufacturing and shipping operations to a  facility. In the 1990s, the development of the SHP website, swansonvitamins.com, opened another sales channel for the company. SHP moved into a new  facility in 2001, finally housing its call center, customer care center, marketing, manufacturing, storage and shipping operations all under one roof, while still maintaining the original storefront in downtown Fargo.

In January 2016, Leland Swanson, Jr. retired and SHP was acquired by Swander Pace Capital, a private equity firm specializing in investments in growth-oriented, middle-market consumer products companies.

In January 2019, the company started selling products containing cannabidiol from industrial hemp, which was federally legalized in the 2018 Farm Bill.

Products and quality control 
Swanson Health Products carries over 26,000 products, ranging from vitamins and supplements to "eco-friendly" home cleaning products. The company has more than 20 Swanson-branded lines that cover the full spectrum of natural health products, as well as some OTC drugs and organic foods. Since 2001, SHP has voluntarily participated in independent third-party Good Manufacturing Practices (GMP) audits to maintain high-quality finished products. SHP regularly submits its dietary supplements to ConsumerLab.com testing for a thorough, third-party review of product safety and efficacy. Consumer lab has tested only 25 of Swanson's 26,000+ supplements as of 9/8/2016.  In yearly surveys of over 10,000 supplement users, Swanson Health Products was voted America's #1 rated catalog/Internet brand based on customer satisfaction (2012, 2014, 2015) and #1 rated catalog/Internet merchant (2011, 2013, 2014, 2015).

FDA actions 
Swanson Health Products has had a few encounters with the United States Food and Drug Administration (FDA), which oversees the marketing and labeling of dietary supplements to ensure they are not labeled as unapproved drugs. In 2007, SHP received a warning letter from the FDA stating that the company was selling an unapproved version of the prescription cholesterol drug called Mevacor. FDA laboratory analysis determined that two of SHP's red yeast rice supplements contained significant amounts of lovastatin, the active ingredient in Mevacor and its generic counterparts. The FDA letter stated, “Because Red Yeast Rice and Red Yeast Rice/Policosanol Complex contain red yeast rice with enhanced or added lovastatin and bear claims about lipid control and other cardiovascular benefits supplied by this ingredient, they cannot be marketed as dietary supplements.”

References

External links
Swanson Health Products official website

Naturopathy
Retail companies of the United States
Companies based in Fargo–Moorhead
Health food stores
Retail companies established in 1969